Seri Yek-e Zarruk (also Romanized as Serī Yek-e Zarrūk; also known as Serī-ye Yek) is a village in Shoaybiyeh-ye Gharbi Rural District, Shadravan District, Shushtar County, Khuzestan Province, Iran. At the 2006 census, its population was 703, in 118 families.

References 

Populated places in Shushtar County